Kristin T. King (born July 21, 1979) is an American ice hockey player. She won a bronze medal at the 2006 Winter Olympics. She graduated from Dartmouth College in 2002.

References

External links
Kristin King's U.S. Olympic Team bio

1979 births
American women's ice hockey forwards
Dartmouth Big Green women's ice hockey players
Ice hockey players from Ohio
Ice hockey players at the 2006 Winter Olympics
Living people
Medalists at the 2006 Winter Olympics
Olympic bronze medalists for the United States in ice hockey
People from Piqua, Ohio